The 2007–08 St. Louis Blues season began on October 4, 2007, with a game in Glendale, Arizona, against the Phoenix Coyotes. It is the Blues' 41st season in the National Hockey League (NHL).

Key dates prior to the start of the season:

The 2007 NHL Entry Draft took place in Columbus, Ohio, on June 22–23.
The free agency period began on July 1.

Regular season
The Blues struggled on the power-play, finishing 31st in power-play goals scored (47) and 30th overall in power-play percentage (14.07%).

Divisional standings

Conference standings

Schedule and results

October

Record: 6–4–0; Home: 4–2–0; Road: 2–2–0 
Attendance: 103,299 (6)

November

Record: 8–4–1; Home: 5–1–0; Road: 3–3–1 
Attendance: 105,838 (6)   Total: 209,137 (12)

December

Record: 5–6–3; Home: 2–4–2; Road: 3–2–1 
Attendance: 139,681 (8)   Total: 348,818 (20)

January

Record: 4–5–3; Home: 3–1–2; Road: 1–4–1 
Attendance: 101,341 (6)      Total: 450,159 (26)

February

Record: 5–7–3; Home: 4–4–1; Road: 1–3–2  
Attendance: 162,932 (9)     Total: 613,091 (35)

March

Record: 3–9–2; Home: 1–3–0; Road: 2–6–2  
Attendance: 72,423 (4)     Total: 685,514 (39)

April

Record: 2–1–1; Home: 1–0–1; Road: 1–1–0 
Attendance: 36,507 (2)   Total: 722,021 (41)

Green background  indicates win.
Red   background  indicates regulation loss.
White background  indicates overtime/shootout loss.

Playoffs
The Blues failed to qualify for the playoffs for the third season in a row and dropped from 81 points (34–35–13) in 2006–07, but they did manage to dramatically increase their average attendance from 12,520 (59.6% of capacity) that year, to 17,610 (92.0% of capacity) in 2007–08.

Player statistics

Skaters
Note: GP = Games played; G = Goals; A = Assists; Pts = Points; PIM = Penalty minutes

* out for season with injury
** traded away

through April 6, 2008

Goaltenders
Note: GP = Games played; TOI = Time on ice (minutes); W = Wins; L = Losses; OT = Overtime/shootout losses; GA = Goals against; SO = Shutouts; SA = Shots against; Sv% = Save percentage; GAA = Goals against average

through April 6, 2008

Awards and records

Records

Milestones

Transactions
The Blues have been involved in the following transactions during the 2007–08 season.

Trades

Free agents

Contract renewals

Signed prospects

Draft picks
St. Louis' picks at the 2007 NHL Entry Draft in Columbus, Ohio.

Farm teams

Peoria Rivermen
The Peoria Rivermen are the Blues American Hockey League affiliate in 2007–08.

Alaska Aces
The Alaska Aces are the Blues affiliate in the ECHL.

See also
2007–08 NHL season
St. Louis Blues seasons

External links
Official website of the St. Louis Blues

References

Player stats: St. Louis Blues player stats on espn.com
Game log: St. Louis Blues game log on espn.com
Team standings: NHL standings on espn.com

 

St. Louis
St. Louis
St. Louis Blues seasons
St Louis
St Louis